Michel Ansermet (born 20 February 1965) is a Swiss pistol shooter who has appeared in two Olympic Games. Ansermet made his Olympic debut in 1996. He won his first medal in 2000 winning silver in the 25 metre rapid fire pistol. He was also active as a cyclist and as such he participated in the prestigious time trial Grand Prix des Nations in 1986.

He is also a herpetologist and director of the Vivarium de Lausanne.

References

1965 births
Living people
Swiss male sport shooters
ISSF pistol shooters
Shooters at the 2000 Summer Olympics
Shooters at the 1996 Summer Olympics
Olympic silver medalists for Switzerland
Olympic medalists in shooting
Medalists at the 2000 Summer Olympics